Kerstersia is a genus of Gram-negative, catalase-positive, oxidase-negative bacteria from the family of Alcaligenaceae.

References

Burkholderiales
Bacteria genera